"The Last One Alive" is the second single by American Christian metal band Demon Hunter from their seventh studio album, Extremist.

Video
The song's official lyric video was created by Online Revolution Design  and premiered on February 25, 2014.

Chart performance

Personnel
 Ryan Clark – vocals
 Patrick Judge – lead guitar
 Jeremiah Scott – rhythm guitar
 Jon Dunn – bass
 Timothy Watts – drums

References

Demon Hunter songs
2014 singles
2014 songs
Solid State Records singles